Kévin Menaldo (born 12 July 1992) is a French track and field athlete who competes in the pole vault.

Born in Bordeaux, he began training with former Olympic pole vault medalist Thierry Vigneron in 2009. He added a further five centimetres to his best in 2010 and won the French junior title.

Menaldo was sixth at the French championships indoors and out in 2013. He also competed at the 2013 European Athletics U23 Championships, but performed poorly and did not get past the qualifying. He cleared  at the beginning of the 2014 indoor season and went on to claim his first national title at the French Indoor Championships.

References

External links

Living people
1992 births
French male pole vaulters
Sportspeople from Bordeaux
World Athletics Championships athletes for France
European Athletics Championships medalists
Athletes (track and field) at the 2016 Summer Olympics
Olympic athletes of France
Mediterranean Games silver medalists for France
Athletes (track and field) at the 2013 Mediterranean Games
Mediterranean Games medalists in athletics